Fair Grounds Field is a baseball stadium in Shreveport, Louisiana, located next to Independence Stadium on the Louisiana State Fair Grounds just off Interstate 20. Fair Grounds Field opened in 1986 and underwent renovations in 1999, 2009, and 2011. The stadium has a seating capacity of 4,200 people.

Fair Grounds Field currently does not have a primary tenant. In the past it has most notably served as the home field of the Shreveport Captains, Shreveport Swamp Dragons, Shreveport-Bossier Sports, and Shreveport-Bossier Captains minor league and independent baseball teams. Fair Grounds Field hosted the 1986 and 1995 Texas League All-Star Games; 1995 Double-A All-Star Game; 1995, 1996, and 1998 Southland Conference baseball tournament; 2004 Summit League baseball tournament; and 2011 Southwestern Athletic Conference baseball tournament. Fair Grounds Field has hosted many college baseball teams including LSU, Louisiana Tech, Northwestern State, Centenary, and LSU–Shreveport. The facility has also been used by local high school baseball teams.

In 2019, there was a $1 million bond issue, however local voters didn't support it, and as of late, there are no plans from the city of Shreveport on what the future of the property will look like. A YouTube video of the current state of the property, uploaded by Chavez Gipson on January 21, 2020, shows that feral cats have made their home, but rumors suggest that bats have also made their home in the stadium.The bats have been professionally removed. The City of Shreveport will be demolishing the baseball stadium. Their plans are to expand the parking lot.

References 

Baseball venues in Louisiana
Minor league baseball venues
Sports venues in Shreveport, Louisiana
1986 establishments in Louisiana
Sports venues completed in 1986
Southland Conference Baseball Tournament venues